Lorenzo Sibilano (born 10 July 197) is an Italian former footballer who played as a defender.

On 2 July 2011 his contract with Andria was mutually terminated.

References

External links
 

1978 births
Italian footballers
Hellas Verona F.C. players
S.S.C. Bari players
Association football defenders
Living people
S.S. Fidelis Andria 1928 players